The 1942 Oklahoma A&M Cowboys football team represented Oklahoma A&M College in the 1942 college football season. This was the 42nd year of football at A&M and the fourth under Jim Lookabaugh. The Cowboys played their home games at Lewis Field in Stillwater, Oklahoma. They finished the season 6–3–1, 3–1 in the Missouri Valley Conference.

Schedule

After the season

The 194 NFL Draft was held on April 8, 1943. The following Cowboys were selected.

References

Oklahoma AandM
Oklahoma State Cowboys football seasons
Oklahoma AandM